Baker Dunleavy (born October 5, 1982) is an American college basketball coach and current head coach for the Quinnipiac Bobcats men's basketball team.

Playing career
After playing at Jesuit High School, Dunleavy took a post-graduate year at the Lawrenceville School, where he subsequently committed to Villanova. In a class with the likes of Randy Foye, Allan Ray, and Curtis Sumpter, Dunleavy appeared in 28 games over his career and was part of the Wildcats' 2005 Sweet 16 squad.

Coaching career
Upon graduation from Villanova, Dunleavy entered the private sector, going to work for Merrill Lynch before accepting a job under Jay Wright in 2010 as the director of basketball operations. Dunleavy climbed the ranks to an assistant coach in 2012, and associate head coach in 2013. In his tenure as an assistant at Villanova, Dunleavy helped the Wildcats to four-straight Big East Conference regular season championships, along with the 2016 national championship team.

On March 28, 2017, Dunleavy was named the seventh coach in Quinnipiac history, and third in Division I, replacing Tom Moore.

Personal life
Dunleavy is the son of former NBA player and coach Mike Dunleavy Sr. His brother Mike Jr. played in the NBA from 2002 to 2017, while his brother, James is an NBA player agent.

He is married to Chrissi Inglesby, whom he met at Villanova. The couple have four daughters.

Head coaching record

NCAA DI

References

1982 births
Living people
American men's basketball coaches
American men's basketball players
Basketball coaches from Oregon
Basketball players from Portland, Oregon
College men's basketball head coaches in the United States
Jesuit High School (Beaverton, Oregon) alumni
Quinnipiac Bobcats men's basketball coaches
Villanova Wildcats men's basketball coaches
Villanova Wildcats men's basketball players
Sportspeople from Portland, Oregon